Melaleuca stramentosa is a plant in the myrtle family, Myrtaceae and is endemic to the south-west of Western Australia. It is a small, bushy shrub similar to Melaleuca similis with its cylindrical leaves and heads of pink to purple flowers but differs in have matted, woolly hairs around the flowers and on the young leaves.

Description
Its young growth is covered with matted, silky or woolly hairs.

The flowers are a shade of pink to purple and are arranged in heads on the ends of branches which continue to grow after flowering and sometimes also in the upper leaf axils. The outer surface of the floral cup (the hypanthium) is hairy and there are five bundles of stamens around the flower, each with 4 to 6 stamens.

Taxonomy and naming
Melaleuca stramentosa was first formally described in 1999 by Lyndley Craven in Australian Systematic Botany from a specimen collected near Jerdacuttup. The specific epithet (stramentosa) is derived from the Latin word stramen meaning "straw" or "litter" referring to the silky or woolly hairs seen on the young growth of this species.

Distribution and habitat
This melaleuca occurs in the Ravensthorpe district in the Esperance Plains biogeographic region where it grows in sand or gravel in heath on plains.

Conservation
Melaleuca stramentosa is classified as "not threatened" by the Government of Western Australia Department of Parks and Wildlife.

References

stramentosa
Plants described in 1999
Endemic flora of Western Australia
Taxa named by Lyndley Craven